This is a list of Laser 2 championship results.

World Championships

Youth Sailing World Championships
The class was used by World Sailing for the Youth Sailing World Championships.

References

Laser 2
World championships in sailing